Ready, Steady, Charlie! (Ge. Achtung, fertig, Charlie!) is a 2003 Swiss movie production directed by Mike Eschmann, starring newcomer Michael Koch, beauty queen Melanie Winiger, and comedian Marco Rima. The plot is a parody about the military service in Switzerland and has been the most successful Swiss movie since 1978's The Swissmakers, and had some success as well in France, the United States, the UK and even in Russia.

Cast 
Michael Koch as Antonio Carrera
Melanie Winiger as Michelle Bluntschi
Mia Aegerter as Laura Moretti
Marco Rima as Captain Franz Reiker
Martin Rapold as Corporal Weiss
Max Rüdlinger as divisionary
Nicolas Steiner as recruit Schlönz
Kaya Inan as recruit Weber
Màrio Almer as recruit Schaffner
Mike Müller as Paolo
Lukas Frey as recruit Gmür
Pascal Nussbaumer as recruit Furgler
Jean Vocat as recruit Lombard
Max Sartore as Grenadier Hinkel
Laila Nielsen as Billie
Tamara Sedmak as military police officer

References

External links 
 

2003 films
Swiss romantic comedy films
Swiss German-language films
2003 romantic comedy films
Military humor in film
2000s German-language films